The 2003 Four Continents Figure Skating Championships was an international figure skating competition in the 2002–03 season. It was held at the Beijing Capital Gymnasium in Beijing, China on February 10–16. Medals were awarded in the disciplines of men's singles, ladies' singles, pair skating, and ice dancing. The compulsory dance was the Quickstep.

Medals table

Results

Men

Ladies

Pairs

Ice dancing

References

External links
 2003 Four Continents Figure Skating Championships

Four Continents Figure Skating Championships, 2003
Four Continents Figure Skating Championships
Four Continents 2003